Jatra (Nepal Bhasa: 𑐖𑐵𑐟𑑂𑐬𑐵, जात्रा) refers to the types of Newa Festivals involving street festival or carnival.

Some jatras 
 Janmadya Jatra: Celebrated in central Kathmandu
 Yenya (Indra Jatra) : Celebrated in central Kathmandu
 Bungdya Jatra: Celebrated in Patan 
 Bisak Jatra: Celebrated in Major parts of Bhaktapur
 Bisket Jatra: Celebrated in Bhaktapur, Dhapasi, Madhyapur Thimi, Tokha and other places in Nepal
 Bhoto Jatra: Celebrated in Patan 
 Gai Jatra: Celebrated on the Kathmandu Valley
 HaadiGaun Jatra: Celebrated in Hadigaun in Kathmandu
Khame Jatra:Celebrated on the Bhaktapur on the ninth day of Dasain
 Shikali Jatra: Celebrated in Khokana, Lalitpur
 Dolkhala Jatra: Celebrated in Dolkha
 Dharmasthali Jatra: Celebrated in Dharmasthali in Kathmandu

See also 
 Newar
 Newa Festival

References

External links
 Jwajalapa

Festivals in Nepal
Newar